A Long March: The First Recordings is the first compilation album by American metal band As I Lay Dying. The album was released on May 16, 2006, through Metal Blade Records. It features their first album Beneath the Encasing of Ashes (2001), as well as re-recorded and original versions of the songs featured on their split album with American Tragedy.

The album was released because the band - as they said - "were a bit tired of seeing Beneath the Encasing of Ashes being sold for unreasonable prices ($90+ on eBay)", so they decided to re-release all of their early recordings in one package.

The compilation's title is the title of the 8th track from Beneath the Encasing of Ashes, making "A Long March" the title track.

Amongst 5 re-recordings, "Reinvention" was specially recorded for this compilation in 2006, while "Illusions" was taken from Shadows Are Security and other 3 ones from Frail Words Collapse.

The version of the track "Beneath the Encasing of Ashes" that is presented on this compilation is slightly shorter than the version on its eponymous album, as it omits a line of spoken dialogue originally present at the beginning of the track.

Track listing

Credits
Jacob Bannon – Design, Photography
Jeff Forest – Engineer, Mixing
Tim Lambesis – Producer
Paul Miner – Engineer
Steve Russell – Producer, Engineer, Mixing
Andy Sneap – Mixing
Brad Vance – Mastering

Charts

References

2006 compilation albums
As I Lay Dying (band) compilation albums
Albums with cover art by Jacob Bannon
Metal Blade Records compilation albums